Njiru is the surname of the following people and places:

People
 Patrick Njiru (born 1957), a former Kenyan rally driver
 Wawira Njiru, a Kenyan entrepreneur, nutritionist, and philanthropist
 Jane Wanjuki Njiru, a Kenyan politician
 Silas Silvius Njiru (1928–2020), a Kenyan Roman Catholic bishop
 Paul Kariuki Njiru (born 1963), a Kenyan Roman Catholic bishop
 James Njiru (died 2013), a Kenyan politician

Places
 Njiru, Nairobi, a neighbourhood in Nairobi